Edward Ashe (c. 1609 – 31 October 1656) was an English politician who sat in the House of Commons from 1640 to 1652.

Ashe was the son of James Ashe of Freshford, Somerset and his wife Grace Pitt, daughter of Richard Pitt of Melcombe Regis He acquired the manors of Halstead, Kent and in 1641, Heytesbury, Wiltshire. 

In November 1640, Ashe was elected Member of Parliament for Heytesbury in the Long Parliament. 
 
Ashe died at the age of 47. He had married Elizabeth Woodward, daughter of Christopher Woodward and had a family of 7. His brother John was MP for Westbury. He was succeeded to his estates by his son William, who rebuilt Heytesbury House c.1700.

References

1609 births
1656 deaths
English MPs 1640–1648
English MPs 1648–1653
People from Sevenoaks District